The Women's 69 kg event at the 2013 Southeast Asian Games took place on 16 December 2013 at Thein Phyu Stadium.

Schedule
All times are Myanmar Standard Time (UTC+06:30)

Results

References

External links

Weightlifting at the 2013 Southeast Asian Games